Rock, Rock, Rock! is a 1956 musical drama film conceived, co-written and co-produced by Milton Subotsky and directed by  Will Price. The film is an early jukebox musical featuring performances by established rock and roll singers of the era, including Chuck Berry, LaVern Baker, Teddy Randazzo, the Moonglows, the Flamingos, and the Teenagers with Frankie Lymon as lead singer. Later West Side Story cast member David Winters is also featured.  Famed disc jockey Alan Freed made an appearance as himself.

The movie has a fairly simple plot: teenage girl Dori Graham (played by then 13-year-old Tuesday Weld, with a credited Connie Francis dubbed in as Dori's singing voice) can't persuade her dad to buy her a strapless gown and has to get the money together herself in time for the prom.  Jack Collins  plays the frustrated dad.

Valerie Harper made her debut in a brief appearance as an extra seated at the center table during the performance of "Ever Since I Can Remember" by Cirino and the Bowties and can be seen after the performance of Frankie Lymon & the Teenagers.  This was also Frankie Lymon & the Teenagers' film debut.

Almost every member of the cast was signed to a record label at the time, which was credited along with each star. In 1984, the film entered the public domain in the United States because the claimants did not renew its copyright registration in the 28th year after publication. The film's numerous musical numbers may have been copyrighted separately, however.

Cast

 Alan Freed — Himself
 Fran Manfred — Arabella
 Tuesday Weld — Dori Graham
 Connie Francis — Dori's Singing Voice
 Teddy Randazzo — Tommy Rogers
 Jacqueline Kerr — Gloria Barker
 Jack Collins — Mr. Graham, Dori's Father
 Carol Moss — Mrs. Graham, Dori's Mother
 Eleanor Swayne — Miss Silky
 Lester Mack — Mr. Bimble
 Bert Conway — Mr. Barker
 Johnny Burnette — as himself 
 David Winters — Melville

Featured songs
"Rock, Rock, Rock" — Jimmy Cavallo & His House Rockers
"I Never Had A Sweetheart" — Connie Francis

"The Things Your Heart Needs" — Teddy Randazzo
"Rock, Pretty Baby" — Ivy Schulman and the Bowties 
"Rock & Roll Boogie" — Alan Freed & His Rock & Roll Band w/"Big" Al Sears (saxophone)
"I Knew From The Start" — The Moonglows
"You Can't Catch Me" — Chuck Berry
"Would I Be Crying" — The Flamingos
"The Big Beat" — Jimmy Cavallo & His House Rockers
"Thanks To You" — Teddy Randazzo (announced as Tommy Rodgers)
"We're Gonna Rock Tonight" — The Three Chuckles With Teddy Randazzo
"Little Blue Wren" — Connie Francis
"Rock, Rock, Rock" — Jimmy Cavallo & His House Rockers
"Lonesome Train (On A Lonesome Track)" — Johnny Burnette Trio
"Over and Over Again" — The Moonglows
"Tra La La" — LaVern Baker
"Ever Since I Can Remember" — Cirino & the Bowties
"Baby Baby" — Frankie Lymon & the Teenagers
"I'm Not a Juvenile Delinquent" — Frankie Lymon and The Teenagers
"Won't You Give Me A Chance" — Teddy Randazzo
"Right Now, Right Now" — Alan Freed & His Rock & Roll Band with "Big" Al Sears (saxophone)

Soundtrack
The soundtrack album, also titled Rock, Rock, Rock!, was released in December 1956 by Chess Records, labeled LP 1425. The soundtrack compilation featured four songs each from only three artists, Chuck Berry, The Moonglows, and The Flamingos.   Only four songs on the album ("Over and Over Again", "I Knew From the Stars", "You Can't Catch Me", and "Would I Be Crying") actually appear in the film.  Rock, Rock, Rock! is regarded as the first rock and roll movie to have had a soundtrack album issued.

The Connie Francis songs "I Never Had a Sweetheart" and "Little Blue Wren" appeared in the film and were also released by MGM Records in 1956 as a Connie Francis single. "Baby, Baby" and "I'm Not a Juvenile Delinquent" by The Teenagers also appeared in the film and were subsequently released as a single by Gee Records.

Production
This was the first feature film collaboration between Milton Subotsky and Max Rosenberg.

Reception
The film was a success at the box office.

See also
List of American films of 1956

References

Sources
 
 Dori Anne

External links 
 
 
 

1956 films
1950s independent films
1950s musical drama films
1950s teen drama films
American black-and-white films
American musical drama films
American rock music films
American teen drama films
1950s English-language films
Articles containing video clips
1956 drama films
Films directed by Will Price
1950s American films